Gyland Church is a parish church of the Church of Norway in the large Flekkefjord Municipality in Agder county, Norway. It is located in Nuland, a few kilometers southwest of the village of Gyland. It is the church for the Gyland parish which is part of the Lister og Mandal prosti (deanery) in the Diocese of Agder og Telemark. The white, wooden church was built in a cruciform design in 1815 using plans drawn up by an unknown architect. The church seats about 300 people.

History
The earliest existing historical records of the church date back to the year 1596, but there is evidence that there was a church in Gyland as far back as the year 1200. The old medieval stave church was located in what is now the village of Gyland. That church was torn down in the early 1600s and it was replaced by a timber-framed long church on the same site. In 1663, the church was inspected and found to be in good condition, but in 1794 when the church was again inspected, it was found to be in poor condition with rot and a roof that had leaks. Due to its poor condition, in 1815 the church building was torn down and a new, larger, cruciform building was constructed on the same site, finally being completed in 1817. Some of the materials from the old building were reused in the new building.

The main reason to move the church was that its new location was more central to the municipality of Gyland that existed at that time. In any case, the church needed major repairs, so something had to be done. The old church was taken down and it was re-constructed at the new site using the same design. The cemetery at the old church site obviously could not be moved and due to the location, it was not possible to establish a new cemetery the new location. In 1970, a new chapel was built at the old church site to serve the cemetery and the new church site is without a cemetery.

See also
List of churches in Agder og Telemark

References

Flekkefjord
Churches in Agder
Wooden churches in Norway
Cruciform churches in Norway
19th-century Church of Norway church buildings
Churches completed in 1815
1815 establishments in Norway